Eugeniusz Kwiatkowski (22 November 1932 – 9 February 1985) was a Polish athlete. He competed in the men's shot put at the 1960 Summer Olympics.

References

1932 births
1985 deaths
Athletes (track and field) at the 1960 Summer Olympics
Polish male shot putters
Olympic athletes of Poland
People from Aleksandrów County
Zawisza Bydgoszcz athletes
20th-century Polish people